St. Alcuin House Seminary is a seminary in Minnesota, United States. It was founded by the Benedictine Order of St. Alcuin as the official seminary of the Communion of Anglican Churches International (CACI) and the Province of St. Alcuin. St. Alcuin House Seminary offers theological and philosophical study programs to prepare people for sacred ministry. The first goal of St. Alcuin House Seminary is "to equip the saints for the work of ministry, for building up the body of Christ" (Eph 4, 11-12).

The St. Alcuin House Seminary has links with other communities, such as the Communion of Anglican Churches International, the English National Catholic Church and the Mexican National Catholic Church. There are two Saint Alcuin House seminaries (in Minnesota and Florida) inside the Saint Alcuin Theological Federation.

The Saint Alcuin House Seminary offers other ministries and programs for students and alumni: the Prayer and Healing Ministry (PHM), the Emmanuel Mission (EM) and the Order of Saint Alcuin (OSA).

Education
The St. Alcuin House Seminary is recognized by the Office of Higher Education of the State of Minnesota and operates currently under Minnesota Statutes 136A.61 to 136A.71 and its licensure is pursuant to Minnesota Statutes Chapter 141. From the Minnesota Office of Higher Education "that courses and degrees or programs to be offered are solely intended to prepare students for ministry, including lay ministry; missionary work, religious instruction and other closely related fields, or to conduct their lives in accordance with the precepts of your faith as believed and practiced".

The seminary offers the following courses:
Certificate in Anglican Studies (C.A.S)
Certificate of Theological Studies (C.T.S)
Licentiate in Theology (L.Th)
Licentiate in Philosophy (L.Ph)
Licentiate in Anglican Theology (L.A.Th)
Licentiate in Anglican Studies (L.A.S)
Master of Arts (MA)
Master of Divinity (M.Div)
Master of Theology (M.Th)
Master of Theological Studies (M.T.S)
Doctor of Philosophy (D.Phil) 
Doctor of Theology (D.Th)
Doctor of Divinity (D.D)
Doctor of Humane Letters (D.H.L).

References

External links
St. Alcuin House website
The Communion of Anglican Churches International official website
St. Alcuin House journal, 2011
St. Alcuin House Journal, 2010

Seminaries and theological colleges in Minnesota
Anglicanism in the United States